International Surfing Day, held annually on the third Saturday of June, is an unofficial, environmentally conscious sports-centered holiday that celebrates the sport of surfing, surfing lifestyle, and the sustainability of ocean resources. Contests and prizes are also part of the celebration, with surfing-related industries donating prizes such as surfboards and wetsuits. Another purpose of the celebration is to promote the popularity of surfing and to attract new participants.

History

International Surfing Day was established in 2005 by Surfing Magazine and The Surfrider Foundation. International Surfing Day closely follows the spirit and intent of the World Surf Day, established by the Usenet newsgroup alt.surfing in 1993. International Surfing Day is a worldwide celebration of the sport of surfing. The day is observed with surf contests, barbecues, film screenings and other surf-related activities. Surfers also use the day to give back to the environment by organizing beach clean-ups, dune and other habitat restoration and other activities such as lobbying to maintain the recreation areas in California where surfing occurs, or planting Naupaka (a flowering coastal plant) in Hawaii.

Direct action was used by form of protest on this day in England to express opposition to sewage in the waters of the Gold Coast; a precarious problem for many surfers who become infected by the bacteria from open wounds from sports-related injuries.

Extent of celebrations
International Surf Day events have been held on all populated continents including South America where it is celebrated in Argentina, Brazil, and Peru. Also in the Southern Hemisphere the holiday is observed in the Oceanian nations of Australia and New Zealand. The day is also widely observed in the American state of Hawaii, also in Oceania.

In North America the surfing day is most widely observed and celebrations may be found in Canada, Costa Rica, the French Antilles, El Salvador, Mexico, and in the majority of coastal states of the United States:
California,
Connecticut,
District of Columbia,
Florida,
Georgia,
Maine,
Maryland,
New Jersey,
New York,
North Carolina,
Oregon,
South Carolina,
Texas,
and Virginia.
After North America the observance has the most popularity in Europe: including in most of the coastal European Union and it is held by surf enthusiasts in France, Italy, the United Kingdom, Portugal, Spain, and Belgium. Further European celebrations are held in Norway, in addition to many of the EU nations overseas possessions.

In Africa, the two French territories of Réunion and Mayotte hold annual festivities alongside Morocco, the Spanish insular area of the Canary Islands and South Africa. The day has also taken hold in some other countries such as Israel and Japan.

See also
Earth Day
Go Skateboarding Day

Notes

External links
 International Surfing Day official website
 International Surfing Day Social Network

June observances
Unofficial observances
Surfing
Recurring events established in 2004
International observances
Saturday observances